The 2021 Florianópolis Challenger was a professional tennis tournament played on clay courts. It was the first edition of the tournament which was part of the 2021 ATP Challenger Tour. It took place in Florianópolis, Brazil from 6 to 12 December 2021.

Singles main-draw entrants

Seeds

 1 Rankings are as of 29 November 2021.

Other entrants
The following players received wildcards into the singles main draw:
  Mateus Alves
  Pedro Boscardin Dias
  Gustavo Heide

The following players received entry into the singles main draw as alternates:
  Luciano Darderi
  Gonzalo Villanueva
  Matías Zukas

The following players received entry from the qualifying draw:
  Nicolás Barrientos
  Wilson Leite
  Igor Marcondes
  Federico Zeballos

Champions

Singles

  Igor Marcondes def.  Hugo Dellien 6–2, 6–4.

Doubles

  Nicolás Barrientos /  Alejandro Gómez def.  Martín Cuevas /  Rafael Matos 6–3, 6–3.

References

2021 ATP Challenger Tour
2021 in Brazilian sport
December 2021 sports events in Brazil